Alp Arslan was the second Sultan of the Seljuk Empire and great-grandson of Seljuk, the eponymous founder of the dynasty. He greatly expanded the Seljuk territory and consolidated his power, defeating rivals to the south and northwest, and his victory over the Byzantines at the Battle of Manzikert, in 1071, ushered in the Turkoman settlement of Anatolia. For his military prowess and fighting skills, he obtained the name Alp Arslan, which means "Heroic Lion" in Turkish.

Early life

Alp Arslan was the son of Chaghri and nephew of Tughril, the founding Sultans of the Seljuk Empire. His grandfather was Mikail, who in turn was the son of the warlord Seljuk. He was the father of numerous children, including Malik-Shah I and Tutush I. It is unclear who the mother or mothers of his children were. He was known to have been married at least twice. His wives included the widow of his uncle Tughril, a Kara-Khanid princess known as Aka or Seferiye Khatun, and the daughter or niece of Bagrat IV of Georgia (who would later marry his vizier, Nizam al-Mulk). One of Seljuk's other sons was the Turkic chieftain Arslan Isra'il, whose son, Kutalmish, contested his nephew's succession to the sultanate. Alp Arslan's younger brothers Suleiman ibn Chaghri and Qavurt were his rivals. Kilij Arslan, the son and successor of Suleiman ibn Kutalmish (Kutalmish's son, who would later become Sultan of Rûm), was a major opponent of the Franks during the First Crusade and the Crusade of 1101.

Early career 

Alp Arslan accompanied his uncle Tughril on campaigns in the south against the Fatimids while his father Chaghri remained in Khorasan. Upon Alp Arslan's return to Khorasan, he began his work in administration at his father's suggestion. While there, his father introduced him to Nizam al-Mulk, one of the most eminent statesmen in early Muslim history and Alp Arslan's future vizier.

After the death of his father, Alp Arslan succeeded him as governor of Khorasan in 1059. His uncle Tughril died in 1063 and had designated his successor as Suleiman, Arslan's infant brother. Arslan and his uncle Kutalmish both contested this succession which was resolved at the battle of Damghan in 1063. Arslan defeated Kutalmish for the throne and succeeded on 27 April 1064 as sultan of the Seljuk Empire, thus becoming sole monarch of Persia from the river Oxus to the Tigris. In 1064 he led a campaign in Georgia during which he captured the regions between Tbilisi and the Çoruh river, Akhalkalaki and Alaverdi. Bagrat IV submitted to paying jizya to the Seljuks but the Georgians broke the agreement in 1065. Alp Arslan invaded Georgia again in 1068. He captured Tbilisi after a short battle and obtained the submission of Bagrat IV; however, the Georgians freed themselves from Seljuk rule around 1073–1074.

In consolidating his empire and subduing contending factions, Arslan was ably assisted by Nizam al-Mulk, and the two are credited with helping to stabilize the empire after the death of Tughril. With peace and security established in his dominions, Arslan convoked an assembly of the states and in 1066, he declared his son Malik Shah I his heir and successor. With the hope of capturing Caesarea Mazaca, the capital of Cappadocia, he placed himself at the head of the Turkoman cavalry, crossed the Euphrates, and entered and invaded the city. Along with Nizam al-Mulk, he then marched into Armenia and Georgia, which he conquered in 1064. After a siege of 25 days, the Seljuks captured Ani, the capital city of Armenia.

Byzantine struggle 
En route to fight the Fatimids in Syria in 1068, Alp Arslan invaded the Byzantine Empire. The Emperor Romanos IV Diogenes, assuming command in person, met the invaders in Cilicia. In three arduous campaigns, the Turks were defeated in detail and driven across the Euphrates in 1070. The first two campaigns were conducted by the emperor himself, while the third was directed by Manuel Comnenos, great-uncle of Emperor Manuel Comnenos. During this time, Arslan gained the allegiance of Rashid al-Dawla Mahmud, the Mirdasid emir of Aleppo.

In 1071, Romanos again took the field and advanced into Armenia with possibly 30,000 men, including a contingent of Cuman Turks as well as contingents of Franks and Normans, under Ursel de Baieul. Alp Arslan, who had moved his troops south to fight the Fatimids, quickly reversed to meet the Byzantines. At Manzikert, on the Murat River, north of Lake Van, the two forces waged the Battle of Manzikert. The Cuman mercenaries among the Byzantine forces immediately defected to the Turkic side. Seeing this, "the Western mercenaries rode off and took no part in the battle." To be exact, Romanos was betrayed by general Andronikos Doukas, son of the Caesar (Romanos's stepson), who pronounced him dead and rode off with a large part of the Byzantine forces at a critical moment. The Byzantines were totally routed.

Emperor Romanos himself was captured and presented to Alp Arslan. It is reported that upon seeing the Roman emperor, the sultan leapt from his throne like a mad man, commanded Romanos to kiss the ground, and stepped on his neck. He repeatedly berated the emperor, including for spurning his emissaries and offers of peace. The unrepentant Romanos was laconic, and deigned only to offer the curtest responses to his captor’s fiery upbraiding. He merely had done what was “possible for a man, and which kings are bound to do, and I have fallen short in nothing. But God has fulfilled his will. And now, do what you wish and abandon recriminations.”

“You are too trivial in my view for me to kill you,” the sultan is said to have declared before his Turks in Muslim sources. "Take him to the person who pays most.”So he was led with the rope round his neck and a proclamation was made about him: ‘Who will buy the king of Byzantium?’ They went on like that going round with him to the tents and the Muslims’ houses and the announcement for him was made in dirhams and fulus [ie. small coinage]. Nobody paid anything for him until they sold him to a man for a dog. The person, who was given the charge of brokering that on his [the sultan’s ] behalf, took the dog and the king and brought them both to Alp Arslan and said: ‘I have been round the whole camp and made a proclamation about him and nobody spent anything on him except a single man who paid me a dog for him’ Alp Arslan replied "That is just, because the dog is better than he is! Take the dog and give this dog [ie. Romanus] to him.". “He struck him three or four blows with his hand and when Romanos collapsed he kicked him a similar number of times”; he “put him in chains and fettered his hand to his neck”; he pulled his hair and put his face to the ground, while telling him, “your troops are food for the Muslims.”

Wishing to test the Roman, Alp Arslan then asked Romanos what he would do to him if he was his prisoner, Romanos frankly answered "the worst!". The answer impressed Alp Arslan and he said "Ah! by Allah! He has spoken the truth! If he had spoken otherwise, he would be lying. This is an intelligent, tough man. It is not permissible that he should be killed". After agreeing on a ransom, Alp Arslan then sent emperor Romanos back to Constantinople with a Turkish escort that carried a banner above the disgraced Emperor that read:"There is no god but Allah and Muhammad is his messenger".

The reason Alp Arslan spared Romanos was likely to avoid a two-front war, since his main rivals the Fatimids were launching devastating raids on his domains and the execution of the Roman Emperor might provoke a renewed and more aggressive Roman offensive against the Seljuks, whereas clemency to Romanus might ease hostilities, Alp Arslan wisely concluded on release for ransom. Even Romanus himself had told the sultan that ‘killing me will not be of any use to you.”

After hearing of the overthrow of Byzantine Emperor Romanos IV Diogenes and realizing the great tribute and concessions promised to him would be denied, Sultan Alp Arslan pledged: “I shall consume with the sword all those people who venerate the cross, and all the lands of the Christians shall be enslaved."

Alp Arslan and his successor Malik Shah urged Turkish tribes to invade and settle Anatolia where they would not only cease to be a problem for the Seljuk Sultanate but also extend its territory further. Alp Arslan commanded the Turks 

Alp Arslan's victories changed the balance in near Asia completely in favour of the Seljuq Turks and Sunni Muslims. While the Byzantine Empire was to continue for nearly four more centuries, the victory at Manzikert signalled the beginning of Turkmen ascendancy in Anatolia. The victory at Manzikert became so popular among the Turks that later every noble family in Anatolia claimed to have had an ancestor who had fought on that day.

State organization 

Alp Arslan's strength lay in the military realm. Domestic affairs were handled by his able vizier, Nizam al-Mulk, the founder of the administrative organization that characterized and strengthened the sultanate during the reigns of Alp Arslan and his son, Malik Shah. Military Iqtas, governed by Seljuq princes, were established to provide support for the soldiery and to accommodate the nomadic Turks to the established Anatolian agricultural scene. This type of military fiefdom enabled the nomadic Turks to draw on the resources of the sedentary Persians, Turks, and other established cultures within the Seljuq realm, and allowed Alp Arslan to field a huge standing army without depending on tribute from conquest to pay his soldiers. He not only had enough food from his subjects to maintain his military, but the taxes collected from traders and merchants added to his coffers sufficiently to fund his continuous wars.

Suleiman ibn Qutalmish was the son of the contender for Arslan's throne; he was appointed governor of the north-western provinces and assigned to completing the invasion of Anatolia. An explanation for this choice can only be conjectured from Ibn al-Athir's account of the battle between Alp-Arslan and Kutalmish, in which he writes that Alp-Arslan wept for the latter's death and greatly mourned the loss of his kinsman.

Death 

After Manzikert, the dominion of Alp Arslan extended over much of western Asia. He soon prepared to march for the conquest of Turkestan, the original seat of his ancestors. With a powerful army he advanced to the banks of the Oxus. Before he could pass the river with safety, however, it was necessary to subdue certain fortresses, one of which was for several days vigorously defended by the rebel, Yusuf al-Kharezmi or Yusuf al-Harani. Perhaps over-eager to press on against his Qarakhanid enemy, Alp Arslan gained the governor's submission by promising the rebel 'perpetual ownership of his lands'. When Yusuf al-Harani was brought before him, the Sultan ordered that he be shot, but before the archers could raise their bows Yusuf seized a knife and threw himself at Alp Arslan, striking three blows before being slain. Four days later on 24 November 1072, Alp Arslan died and was buried at Merv, having designated his 18-year-old son Malik Shah as his successor.

Family
One of his wives was Safariyya Khatun. She had a daughter, Sifri Khatun, who in 1071–72, married Abbasid Caliph Al-Muqtadi. Safariyya died in Isfahan in 1073–4. Another of his wives was Akka Khatun. She had been formerly the wife of Sultan Tughril. Alp Arslan married her after Tughril's death in 1063. Another of his wives was Shah Khatun. She was the daughter of Qadir Khan Yusuf, and had been formerly married to Ghaznavid Mas'ud. Another of his wives was the daughter of the Georgian king Bagrat. They married in 1067–68. He divorced her soon after, and married her to Fadlun. His sons were Malik-Shah I, Tutush I, Tekish and Arslan Arghun. One of his daughters married the son of Kurd Surkhab, son of Bard in 1068. Another daughter, Zulaikha Khatun, was married to Muslim, son of Quraish in 1086–7. Another daughter, Aisha Khatun, married Shams al-Mulk Nasr, son of Ibrahim Khan Tamghach.

Legacy 

Alp Arslan's conquest of Anatolia from the Byzantines is also seen as one of the pivotal precursors to the launch of the Crusades.

From 2002 to July 2008 under Turkmen calendar reform, the month of August was named after Alp Arslan.

The 2nd Training Motorized Rifle Division of the Turkmen Ground Forces is named in his honour.

Notes

References

Sources 
 
 
 
 
 
 
 Çoban, R. V. (2020). The Manzikert Battle and Sultan Alp Arslan with European Perspective in the 15st Century in the Miniatures of Giovanni Boccaccio's "De Casibus Virorum Illustrium"s 226 and 232. French Manuscripts in Bibliothèque Nationale de France. S. Karakaya ve V. Baydar (Ed.), in 2nd International Muş Symposium Articles Book (pp. 48–64). Muş: Muş Alparslan University. Source

11th-century births
11th-century murdered monarchs
1072 deaths
Seljuk rulers
Byzantine–Seljuk wars
11th-century Turkic people
Deaths by stabbing
Shahanshahs